Suffolk is a county in East Anglia. It is bounded by Norfolk to the north, Cambridgeshire to the west, Essex to the south and the North Sea to the east. At the top level of local government is Suffolk County Council, and below it are 5 borough and district councils: Babergh, Ipswich, Mid Suffolk, West Suffolk and East Suffolk. Much of the coast consists of the estuaries of the Orwell, Stour, Alde, Deben and Blyth rivers, with large areas of wetlands and marshes. Agriculture and shipping play a major role in the county's economy.

In England, Sites of Special Scientific Interest (SSSIs) are designated by Natural England, a non-departmental public body which is responsible for protecting England's natural environment. Designation as an SSSI gives legal protection to the most important wildlife and geological sites. As of October 2017 there are 142 SSSIs in Suffolk, of which 109 are biological, 28 geological and 5 are designated under both criteria.

One site is in the Dedham Vale, an Area of Outstanding Natural Beauty (AONB), and thirty-six are in another AONB, Suffolk Coast and Heaths. There are thirty-three Geological Conservation Review sites, twenty-three Nature Conservation Review sites, twenty Special Areas of Conservation, thirty Special Protection Areas under the European Union Directive on the Conservation of Wild Birds, eight Ramsar internationally important wetland sites, seven national nature reserves and four contain scheduled monuments. Six sites are local nature reserves, twenty-seven are managed by the Suffolk Wildlife Trust, five by the Royal Society for the Protection of Birds and one by the National Trust.

Key

Interest
B = a site of biological interest
G = a site of geological interest

Public access
FP = access to footpaths through the site only
NO = no public access to site
PL = public access at limited times
PP = public access to part of site
YES = public access to the whole or most of the site

Other classifications
DVAONB = Dedham Vale, an Area of Outstanding Natural Beauty
GCR = Geological Conservation Review
LNR = Local nature reserve
NCR = A Nature Conservation Review
NNR = National nature reserve
NT = National Trust
Ramsar = Ramsar site, an internationally important wetland site
RSPB = Royal Society for the Protection of Birds
SAC = Special Area of Conservation
SCHAONB = Suffolk Coast and Heaths, an Area of Outstanding Natural Beauty
SM = Scheduled monument
SPA = Special Protection Area under the European Union Directive on the Conservation of Wild Birds
SWT = Suffolk Wildlife Trust

Sites

See also

List of Local Nature Reserves in Suffolk
National Nature Reserves in Suffolk
Suffolk Wildlife Trust

Notes

References

Sources

 
Suffolk
Sites of Special Scientific Interest
Geology of East of England